Mi Tiempo (My Time) is the 13th studio album recorded by Puerto Rican performer Chayanne. This album was released by Sony BMG Norte and Columbia Records on April 10, 2007 (see 2007 in music). The album was produced by Sebastián de Peyrecave and José Gentile. Six singles were released to promote the album: "Si Nos Quedara Poco Tiempo", "Tengo Miedo", "Indispensable", "Lola", "Te Amaré", and "Bailarina".

It debuted and peaked at position #42 on the U.S. Billboard 200.

Track listing

Music videos
Si Nos Quedara Poco Tiempo

Personnel

Chayanne – Vocals
Sebastián de Peyrecave – Acoustic and electric guitar, Percussion, Arranger, Drums, Hammond organ, Programming, Producer, Engineer, Mixing
José Gentile – Synthesizer, Acoustic and electric guitar, Piano, Arranger, Keyboards, Programming, Producer, Engineer, Slide Guitar, String Arrangements, Mixing, Cello Arrangement, Background Vocals 
Pedro Namerow – Arranger, Keyboards, Programming, Melodica, Engineer, Assistant Engineer
Estéfano – Background Vocals
Prince Patrick – Vocals
José Tomás Díaz – Vocals, Percussion
Leo Quntero – Acoustic guitar, Cuatro
Andrew Synowiec – Electric guitar, Slide Guitar, E-Bow
Fernando Huergo – Bass
Víctor Indrizzo – Drums
Richard Bravo – Percussion
Jimmy Rey – Arranger, Programming
Teddy Mulet – Trombone, Brass, Brass Arrangement
Wells Cunningham – Cello
Natalia Betancurt – Background Vocals
Yisel Duque – Background Vocals
Dennis Reyes – Background Vocals
Janet Dacal – Background Vocals
Mónica Sierra – Background Vocals
Rob Jaczko – Engineer
Dave Way – Engineer
John Weston – Engineer
Miguel Pessoa – Engineer
Zeph Sowers – Assistant Engineer
David Stearns – Assistant Engineer
Jack Young – Assistant Engineer
Vlado Meller – Mastering
Odisa Beltran – Production Coordination
Claudia Salgado – Production Coordination
Andrew List – Conductor
 1st Violin – Gregory Vitale, Paula Oaks, Kristina Nilsson, Christine Vitale, Pattison Story, Gerals Mordis
 2nd  Violin – Maynard Goldman, Robert Curtis, Melissa Howe, Olga Kusnetzova, Susan Faux, Sonja Larson
 Viola – Jean Haig, Abigail Kubert-Cross, Susan Curran-Culpo, Lisa Suslowicz, Stephen Dyball
 Cello – Ronal Lowry, Melany Dyball, Marc Moskovitz, Alexandre Lecarme
 Double Bass – Robert Lynam, Barry Boettger, Irving Steinberg

Charts

Sales and certifications

References

2007 albums
Chayanne albums
Spanish-language albums
Sony BMG Norte albums
Columbia Records albums